Enoch Lloyd Branson (1853–1925) was an American artist best known for his portraits of Southern politicians and depictions of early East Tennessee history.  
One of the most influential figures in Knoxville's early art circles, Branson received training at the National Academy of Design in the 1870s and subsequently toured the great art centers of Europe.  After returning to Knoxville, he operated a portrait shop with photographer Frank McCrary.  He was a mentor to fellow Knoxville artist Catherine Wiley, and is credited with discovering twentieth-century modernist Beauford Delaney.

Life

Branson was born in what is now Union County, Tennessee, (then part of Knox County) to English parents.  His family moved to Knoxville in 1868, where Lloyd found work in a brickyard.  As a child, he impressed his friends by crafting small figures out of clay.

Around the time of the Civil War, prominent Knoxville physician John Mason Boyd noticed a sketch of Ulysses S. Grant Branson had made on a cigar box, and provided financial assistance for Branson to attend East Tennessee University.  In 1871, Branson drew favorable attention for his exhibition at the East Tennessee Division Fair.  By the following year, his portraits had impressed art enthusiasts to the extent that the Knoxville Chronicle described him as Knoxville's "native genius."

Branson moved to New York in 1873, where he attended the National Academy of Design.  Two years later, he captured first prize at one of the Academy's exhibitions for his drawing of a gladiator, which earned him a scholarship to receive further training in Paris.  Some of Branson's later work showed elements of the French Barbizon school, though it's uncertain whether or not he ever visited Europe.

By 1876, he had returned to Knoxville, and quickly became a leading figure in the city's art community.  Working in partnership with early photographer T. M. Schleier, he focused primarily on commercial portraits.  He became a regular at the masquerade balls attended by the city's elite at the Lamar House Hotel, and spent time at resorts such as Tate Springs.

In 1880, Branson and photographer Frank McCrary formed McCrary and Branson, a Photograph & Portrait Artists company that operated out of a three-story building on Gay Street in Knoxville. The company, which at times included Branson's brother, Oliver, and sister-in-law, Laura, specialized in oil-painted photographs, oil copies, crayon-and-oil sketches, and illustrated souvenirs.  Branson also taught art classes in the building, often to members of Knoxville's upper class.  Impressionist Catherine Wiley, Adelia Armstrong Lutz, and Mortimer Thompson were arguably his most well-known students during this period. Branson's work was exhibited at the 1893 Chicago World's Fair, the 1900 World's Fair in Paris, and the 1901 Pan-American Exposition in Buffalo.  He won the gold medal for an exhibition at the 1895 Cotton States Exposition in Atlanta and in 1896, he won a national competition for designing the Flag of Knoxville, Tennessee.

Branson reached the height of his career in 1910, when his work, Hauling Marble, won the gold medal at Knoxville's Appalachian Exposition. In the early 1920s, Branson began giving lessons to a young Beauford Delaney, whose sketches he found impressive. In 1924, he arranged to send Delaney to an art school in Boston to receive further instruction.

Branson died of "chronic Bright's disease" on June 12, 1925.  He is buried in Old Gray Cemetery in Knoxville.

Works

Branson was a stylistically conservative painter, especially in his early years, though some of his later works show elements of impressionism and modern styles. Most of his work consisted of commercial portraits, but his most well-known tend to depict historical scenes of the Appalachian frontier.  His work is on display in the Tennessee State Museum and the Frist Center for the Visual Arts in Nashville, and the Knoxville Museum of Art, the McClung Museum of Natural History and Culture, and the East Tennessee History Center in Knoxville.  One of Branson's most popular paintings, The Battle of King's Mountain, was displayed in the Hotel Imperial in Knoxville, and was destroyed when the hotel burned in 1917.

Historical paintings

Sheep Shearing Scene
The Blockhouse at Knoxville, Tennessee
Assault on Fort Sanders
Hauling Marble (also known as The Toilers or Rock Haulers), (c. 1890)
Women at Work, 1891
California to Oregon Stagecoach, 1900
Gathering of Overmountain Men at Sycamore Shoals, 1915

Portraits

Branson painted portraits of the following individuals:

Adelia Armstrong Lutz (1878)
Brig. Gen. John Porter McCown, C.S.A., c. 1880 (attributed)
Ellen McClung Berry
Horace Maynard
George Armstrong Custer, Lt. Col., Regular Army (United States)
Abram Jones Price 
J. G. M. Ramsey
Thomas William Humes
Joseph Estabrook
DeWitt Clinton Senter
Peter Turney
Alvin C. York
John Haywood
John I. Cox
James B. Frazier
Montgomery Stuart
Hester Thompson Stuart
James Allen Smith
Captain James N. Williamson, CSA, ca. 1916
Emma Elizabeth Strawn Johnson, Co-Founder and Second President of Johnson University (1925–27)

Legacy

Branson Avenue in Knoxville is named in Branson's honor.  His house still stands along the road, and has been purchased for restoration by the preservation group, Knox Heritage.

Further reading
Anderson, John A.  The Art of Lloyd Branson: A Family Connection (Nashville: Branson Art Organization, 2012).

See also

Washington Bogart Cooper

References

External links

Works of Branson and McCrary — Calvin M. McClung Historical Collection
Tennessee Portrait Project - Lloyd Branson entries

People from Knoxville, Tennessee
19th-century American painters
American male painters
20th-century American painters
University of Tennessee alumni
1853 births
1925 deaths
Painters from Tennessee
National Academy of Design alumni
American people of English descent
19th-century American male artists
20th-century American male artists